Melanocetus rossi is a species of black seadevil, a type of anglerfish.

References

Melanocetidae
Deep sea fish
Fish described in 1981